Sheida is a 1999 film by the Iranian director Kamal Tabrizi. It was scripted by Reza Maghsoodi and lensed by Mohammad Aladpoush. Leila Hatami, Parsa Pirouzfar and Behzad Farahani starred in the film. Set in the context of the Iran-Iraq war, Sheida is an example of the Sacred Defence genre of Iranian cinema.

Cast 
 Leila Hatami
 Parsa Pirouzfar 
 Behzad Farahani 
 Mohammad-Reza Sharifinia 
 Gohar Kheirandish
 Kamand Amirsoleimani
 Nadia Deldargolchin

References

Iran–Iraq War films
Iranian war films
Films directed by Kamal Tabrizi